Yes, Sir. Sorry, Sir! is a television drama produced by TVB.

Qiqihar Association Lam Tin Kwong Memorial Secondary School

Teaching Staff

Class 5C

Law Family

Ho Family

Yau Family

Koo Family

CID

"Chun Hing" Triad Society

Others

See also 
Yes, Sir. Sorry, Sir!

Yes, Sir. Sorry, Sir!
Yes, Sir. Sorry, Sir!